In June 2011, the Election Commission of India (ECI), established the India International Institute of Democracy and Election Management (IIIDEM) to advance its professional competence in election management, promote peoples participation, contribute to developing stronger democratic institutions and support the efforts of ECI in carrying out its mandate and functions.

History
Over the last six decades, the structure and functions of the Election Commission have undergone major changes and  thus the management of elections has become increasingly complex.  A rapid transformation in social context and reality, rising number of political parties, changing dynamics and demands of coalitions and alliances, frequent elections and bye-elections, increase in number of eligible voters and continuous updating of electoral rolls have led to new challenges for election management bodies of today.

The ‘Vision @ 60’ document of the Commission aims to conduct elections that are completely free of crime and abuse of money power, based on a seamless electoral roll with voters’ full participation.  To translate this to reality, close to 11 million personnel at various levels are engaged to carry out the constitutional mandate of the Commission.  They need to be equipped with competency and skills, in response to which the Commission has signed Memorandums of Understanding with a number of countries and inter-government agencies for sharing best practices and providing technical assistance.

With regard to institutionalizing training for election management bodies to be fully equipped for undertaking such visionary action; the Election Commission of India had created a separate training division. However, this division was not in a position to provide undivided attention to the changing needs of training, capacity development, research and documentation.  Therefore, to provide coordination for all training activities across the country and assist young and emerging democracies abroad,  IIIDEM was established to ensure that all election managers maintain high professional standards in imparting their election duties.

Academics

Campus
The IIIDEM is presently housed in the premises of the Election Commission of India.  A sprawling 5 acre campus of the Institute is underway at Dwarka (Sector 13) in New Delhi, which is just 10 kilometers away from the Indira Gandhi International Airport.

Structure
IIIDEM is headed by a Director General and has the following centers of excellence:

i.	Centre for Training and Capacity Development
This Centre provides comprehensive training programmes along with refresher courses and theme-based programmes in election management. A team of National Level Master Trainers (NLMTs) is developed to deliver a cascaded training approach targeted at District Election Officers, Returning Officers and Electoral Officers.

ii.	Centre for International Cooperation and Capacity Building:
This Centre foresees international collaboration with focus on overseas training development, tie- ups with international electoral organizations and other international workshops in collaboration with international organizations.

iii.	Centre for IT and E- Learning:
The Centre is tasked with development of E-Learning LMS and improvement of available modules to achieve professional quality.  The Centre also forms partnerships with E- Learning Organizations/ Institutions in India and across the globe.

iv.	Centre for Voter Education:
This Centre works on capacity development for voter education, documentation for international best practices in voter education and also formalizes international collaboration in this field.

v.	Centre for Innovation, Research and Documentation:
This Centre does research on electoral data, promotes innovation and prepares documents on various electoral subjects.  The Centre also interacts with academic institutions for development of collaborative projects and literature on elections.

vi.	Centre for Electoral Laws:
This Centre is engaged in the study of Indian and international electoral laws.  Additionally, the Centre also provides necessary support to other wings in developing modules for training.  The Centre is also involved in developing international standards and practices for improving electoral laws and election management processes.

Publications
IIIDEM brings out several handbooks/ guidebooks for different types of election functionaries. Along with this, IIIDEM also develops materials like case studies, films, mock polling materials et al.  The Institute also undertakes applied research to connect the world of theory on democracy and election management to actual practice and hands on experience.

Alumni

International Alumni
International alumni includes senior functionaries such as Chairpersons, Director of Elections, Deputy Director General, Election Officers et al. from Afghanistan, Australia, Azerbaijan, Bangladesh, Belarus, Belize, Bhutan, Botswana, Cambodia, Cameroon, Costa Rica, Cote D’Ivore, Democratic Republic of Congo, East Timor, Egypt, El Salvador, Ethiopia, Fiji, Gambia, Georgia, Ghana, Grenada, Guyana, Jamaica, Jordan, Kenya, Kyrgyzstan, Lebanon, Lesotho, Lithuania, Malawi, Malaysia, Maldives, Mauritius, Mongolia, Mozambique, Myanmar, Namibia, Nauru, Nepal, Niger, Nigeria, Pakistan, Palestine, Panama, Papua New Guinea, Peru, Samoa, Senegal, Sierra Leone, South Africa, South Sudan, Sri Lanka, St. Lucia, Sudan, Tajikistan, Tanzania, Thailand, Tonga, Trinidad and Tobago, Turkmenistan, Tuvalu, Uganda, Uzbekistan, Vanuatu, Yemen and Zambia.

Domestic Alumni
Domestic alumni include Chief Electoral Officers of Indian states, additional Chief Electoral Officers, Returning Officers and other Election Functionaries.

References

2011 establishments in Delhi
Election Commission of India
Government agencies established in 2011
Organisations based in Delhi